Haworthiopsis venosa, formerly Haworthia venosa, known in Afrikaans as venstertjie, is a species of flowering plant in the genus Haworthiopsis belonging to the family Asphodelaceae, native to Namibia and South Africa.

Naming and taxonomy
The genus name Haworthiopsis means "like Haworthia", which honors the British botanist Adrian Hardy Haworth (1767–1833), while the species epithet venosa means "veined".

The species was previously included in Haworthia subgenus Hexangulares. Phylogenetic studies demonstrated that subgenus Hexangulares was actually relatively unrelated to other haworthias and so it was moved to the new genus Haworthiopsis.

Description
It is a mat-forming succulent evergreen perennial reaching  in height. Stemless rosettes of 12–15 fleshy, triangular, lanceolate, dark green leaves show a few pale green lines along the upper surfaces and small teeth along the margins.

Distribution
This species occurs over a large area, from the inland Karoo and Namibia to as far south as the northern part of the Breede River valley. Here it occurs on rocky slopes.

Cultivation

Haworthia venosa subsp. tesselata has won the Royal Horticultural Society's Award of Garden Merit.

References

 Tropicos
 Plant list

venosa
Flora of the Cape Provinces
Garden plants